Alom is a surname. Notable people with the surname include:

Hero Alom, Bangladeshi freelancer music video model and actor active on social media
Juan Carlos Alom (born 1964), Cuban photographer and experimental filmmaker
Nelson Alom (born 1990), Indonesian footballer
Nerius Alom (born 1994), Indonesian footballer
Saiful Alom, Bengali politician